Pyrgolampros is a genus of sea snails, marine gastropod mollusks in the family Pyramidellidae, the pyrams and their allies.

This genus is now included in the genus Turbonilla Risso, 1826

References

External links
 To World Register of Marine Species

Pyramidellidae